Litvak may refer to:

 Lithuanian Jews
 One of the Yiddish dialects associated with Jews of Lithuanian origin

People 
 Anatole Litvak (1902–1974), Lithuanian-American filmmaker
 Jesse Litvak, financier
 Lena Litvak (born 1988), American tennis player
 Lydia Litvyak (1921–1943), fighter pilot in the Soviet Air Force
 Meir Litvak, Israeli historian
 Michel Litvak (born 1951), Belgian businessman 
 Moshe Litvak (1926–2012), Israeli footballer
 Salvador Litvak (born 1965), American screenwriter, film director and producer
 Sergio Litvak, retired Chilean football goalkeeper

See also 
 Litvin, a Slavic term meaning residents of the Grand Duchy of Lithuania